Snow White and the Seven Dwarfs is a Broadway play that debuted at the Little Theatre on West 44th Street, New York City, on October 31, 1912. Based on the stories by the Brothers Grimm, it was produced by Winthrop Ames who had written it under the pseudonym "Jessie Braham White." The play, starring Marguerite Clark, met with favorable reviews and became the basis for the 1916 film Snow White, also starring Clark.

Cast of characters (opening night) 
Princess Snow White  :  Marguerite Clark
Queen Brangomar  :  Elaine Inescort
Rosalys  :  Madeline Fairbanks
Amelotte  :  Harriot Ingalls
Ermengarde  :  Jeannette Dix
Guinivere  :  Dorothy Preyer
Christabel  :  Marion Fairbanks
Astolaine  :  Madelaine Chieff
Ursula  :  Walden
Lynette  :  Phyllis Anderson
Sir Dandiprat Bombas, the Court Chamberlain : Frank McCormack
Berthold, the Huntsman  :  Arthur Barry
Prince Florimond of Calydon  :  Donald Gallaher
Valentine  :  Peter Miller
Vivian  :  Royal Herring
The Seven Dwarfs Scene 3
Blick, the eldest of the seven  :  Edward See
Flick  :  Harry Burnham
Glick  :  Marie Cullen
Snick  :  Emmet Hampton
Plick  :  Charles Everett
Whick  :  John Davis
Quee, the youngest "boy" of the seven, nearly ninety-nine years old with an apparent chronic thievery issue  :  Dorothy Farrier
Witch Hex  :  Ada Boshell
Long Tail  :  William Grey
Short Tail  :  Patrick Driscoll
Lack Tail  :  Arthur Simpson

See also 
Snow White (1916 film)

References

External links

 
 
 

Broadway plays
Works based on Snow White
1912 plays
Plays based on fairy tales